Juban, officially the Municipality of Juban, is a 4th class municipality in the province of Sorsogon, Philippines. According to the 2020 census, it has a population of 35,297 people.

Geography

Barangays
Juban is politically subdivided into 25 barangays.

Climate

Demographics

Economy

References

External links

 Juban Profile at PhilAtlas.com
 [ Philippine Standard Geographic Code]
 Philippine Census Information
 Local Governance Performance Management System

Municipalities of Sorsogon